Javier García Delgado (born 10 September 1976) is a Spanish fencer. He competed in the individual foil event at the 1996 Summer Olympics.

Notes

References

External links
 
 
 
 

1976 births
Living people
Spanish male foil fencers
Olympic fencers of Spain
Fencers at the 1996 Summer Olympics
People from La Bañeza
Sportspeople from the Province of León